Hermann Otto Theodor Paul (August 7, 1846, Salbke – December 29, 1921, Munich) was a German philologist, linguist and lexicographer.

Biography
He studied at Berlin and Leipzig, and in 1874 became professor of German language and literature in the University of Freiburg. In 1893 he was appointed professor of German philology at the University of Munich. He was a prominent Neogrammarian.

Works
His main work, Prinzipien der Sprachgeschichte (Halle: Max Niemeyer, 1st ed. 1880; 3d ed. 1898), has been translated into English:
Paul, Hermann 1970. Principles of the History of Language, translated from 2nd edition by H. A. Strong (1888; retranslated with changes by Strong, Logeman, and Wheeler in 1891). College Park: McGroth Publishing Company, .

According to Paul, sentences are the sum of their parts. They arise sequentially from individual associations, linked together in a linear form (1886. See also, Blumenthal, 1970). Wilhelm Wundt opposed this theory of sentences, arguing that they begin as a simultaneous thought that is converted into linear, sequential parts (1900).

Other works:

Gab es eine mittelhochdeutsche Schriftsprache? (“Was there a middle high German written language?,” 1873)
Zur Lautverschiebung (“Vowel shifting,” 1874)
Kritische Beiträge zu den Minnesingern (“Critical contributions on the Minnesingers,” 1876)
Zur Nibelungenfrage (“On the Nibelungen question,” 1877)
Mittelhochdeutsche Grammatik (“Middle high German grammar,” 1881; 25th edition, 2007)
Grundriss der germanischen Philologie, editor (“Outline of German philology,” 1891-93)
Aufgabe und Methode der Geschichtswissenschaften (“Function and method of sciences of history,” 1920, E-Book: Berlin 2014, 
After 1874 Paul and Wilhelm Braune edited the Beiträge zur Geschichte der deutschen Sprache und Literatur (“Contributions to the history of the German language and its literature”).

Disambiguation
This Hermann Paul is not to be confused with 
 Herman Daniel Paul (1827–1885), who emigrated from Germany to Finland, where he worked as a language teacher and music reviewer.  He published a translation of the Finnish national epic Kalevala in 1885 (G. W. Edlund's publishing house, Helsingfors).
nor with
 Hermann Paul (1902–1944), who was a Hungarian musician.

See also

 Rudolf Much

References

External links
 
 Principles of the History of Language, English translation of the second edition by Herbert Strong
 Prinzipien der Sprachgeschichte, German original of Hermann Paul's main book Principles of the History of Language
 A partial French translation of Hermann Paul's main book, Principles of the History of Language

1846 births
1921 deaths
German lexicographers
Linguists from Germany
Historical linguists
Germanic studies scholars
Humboldt University of Berlin alumni
Leipzig University alumni
Linguists of Germanic languages
Academic staff of the Ludwig Maximilian University of Munich
Academic staff of the University of Freiburg
German male non-fiction writers
Members of the Royal Society of Sciences in Uppsala